This is a partial list of Spanish sportspeople. For the full plain list of Spanish sportspeople on Wikipedia, see :Category:Spanish sportspeople.

Alpine skiing
Blanca Fernández Ochoa
Francisco Fernández Ochoa
María José Rienda
Carolina Ruiz Castillo

Archery
Juan Holgado
Juan Holgado
Antonio Vázquez

Athletics
José Manuel Abascal
Abel Antón
Ruth Beitia
Fermín Cacho
Marta Domínguez
Reyes Estévez
Paquillo Fernández
Martín Fiz
Jesús Ángel García
Javier García
José Luis González
Encarna Granados
Yago Lamela
Joan Lino Martínez
Jorge Llopart
Miguel Ángel López
José Marín
Eliseo Martín
Manuel Martínez Gutiérrez
Mayte Martínez
Valentí Massana
Juan Manuel Molina
Niurka Montalvo
Sandra Myers
Antonio Peñalver
Daniel Plaza
Julio Rey
Natalia Rodríguez
María Vasco

Badminton
Pablo Abián
Carolina Marín

Basketball
Fernando Arcega
José Manuel Beirán
José Calderón
Víctor Claver
Juan Antonio Corbalán
Rudy Fernández
Marc Gasol
Pau Gasol
Serge Ibaka
Andrés Jiménez Fernández
José Luis Llorente
Sergio Llull
Juan Manuel López Iturriaga
Josep Maria Margall
Fernando Martín Espina
Juan Carlos Navarro
Felipe Reyes
Sergio Rodríguez
Fernando Romay
Víctor Sada
Fernando San Emeterio
Juan Antonio San Epifanio
Ignacio Solozábal

Beach volleyball
Elsa Baquerizo
Javier Bosma
Fabio Díez
Liliana Fernández
Adrián Gavira
Pablo Herrera
Raúl Mesa

Biathlon
Victoria Padial

Bobsleigh
Luis Nunoz
Alfonso de Portago

Boxing
Rafael Lozano
Faustino Reyes
Enrique Rodríguez

Canoeing
David Cal
Maialen Chourraut
Saúl Craviotto
Guillermo del Riego
José María Esteban
José Ramón López
Herminio Menéndez
Enrique Míguez
Carlos Pérez
Luis Gregorio Ramos
Narcisco Suárez

Cross-country skiing
Laura Orgué

Cycling
Carlos Castaño Panadero
Sergi Escobar
José Antonio Escuredo
Margarita Fullana
José Antonio Hermida
Miguel Indurain
Joan Llaneras
Asier Maeztu
José Manuel Moreno
Leire Olaberria
Abraham Olano
Samuel Sánchez
Toni Tauler
Carlos Torrent

Equestrian
José Álvarez de Bohórquez
Beatriz Ferrer-Salat
Jaime García
Julio García Fernández de los Ríos
Marcellino Gavilán
Juan Antonio Jimenez
José Navarro Morenés
Ignacio Rambla
Rafael Soto

Fencing
José Luis Abajo

Field hockey

Male players

Jaume Amat
Juan Amat
Pedro Amat
Pol Amat
Juan Arbós
Jaime Arbós
Javier Arnau
Jordi Arnau
Óscar Barrena
Francisco Caballer
Javier Cabot
Ricardo Cabot
Juan Calzado
Miguel Chaves
Ignacio Cobos
Juan Coghen
José Colomer
Miguel de Paz
Carlos del Coso
José Dinarés
Juan Dinarés
Eduardo Dualde
Joaquín Dualde
Rafael Egusquiza
Juan Escarré
Xavier Escudé
Francisco Fábregas
Juantxo García-Mauriño
José García
Rafael Garralda
Antonio González
Ramón Jufresa
Ignacio Macaya
Joaquim Malgosa
Santiago Malgosa
Paulino Monsalve
Pedro Murúa
Juan Pellón
Victor Pujol
Carlos Roca
Pedro Roig
Ramón Sala
Luis Usoz
Pablo Usoz
Narcís Ventalló
Jaime Zumalacárregui

Female players

María Ángeles Rodríguez
María Carmen Barea
Sonia Barrio
Mercedes Coghen
Celia Corres
Natalia Dorado
Nagore Gabellanes
Mariví González
Anna Maiques
Silvia Manrique
Elisabeth Maragall
María Isabel Martínez
Teresa Motos
Nuria Olivé
Virginia Ramírez
Maider Tellería

Figure skating
Javier Fernández

Football
Raúl Albiol
Álvaro Arbeloa
Sergio Busquets
Joan Capdevila
Iker Casillas
Cesc Fàbregas
Andrés Iniesta
Fernando Llorente
Juan Mata
Javi Martínez
Jesús Navas
Pedro
Gerard Piqué
Carles Puyol
Sergio Ramos
Pepe Reina
David Silva
Fernando Torres
Víctor Valdés
David Villa
Xabi Alonso
Xavi

Golf
Seve Ballesteros
Sergio García
Azahara Muñoz

Gymnastics
Marta Baldó
Nuria Cabanillas
Gervasio Deferr
Estela Giménez
Lorena Guréndez
Tania Lamarca
Estíbaliz Martínez
Patricia Moreno
Carolina Pascual

Handball

Male players

David Barrufet
Jon Belaustegui
David Davis
Talant Duyshebaev
Alberto Entrerríos
Raúl Entrerríos
Salvador Esquer
Aitor Etxaburu
Jesús Fernández
Jaume Fort
Rubén Garabaya
Juanín García
Mateo Garralda
Raúl González
Rafael Guijosa
Fernando Hernández
José Javier Hombrados
Demetrio Lozano
Cristian Malmagro
Enric Masip
Jordi Nuñez
Xavier O'Callaghan
Jesús Olalla
Antonio Carlos Ortega
Juan Pérez
Carlos Prieto
Albert Rocas
Iker Romero
Víctor Tomás
Antonio Ugalde
Iñaki Urdangarin
Alberto Urdiales
Andrei Xepkin

Female players

Macarena Aguilar
Nely Carla Alberto
Jessica Alonso Bernardo
Vanesa Amorós
Andrea Barnó
Elisabeth Chávez
Mihaela Ciobanu
Verónica Cuadrado
Patricia Elorza
Beatriz Fernández
Begoña Fernández
Marta Mangué
Carmen Martín
Silvia Navarro
Elisabeth Pinedo

Judo
Miriam Blasco
Isabel Fernández
Almudena Muñoz
Ernesto Pérez
Yolanda Soler

Rowing
Fernando Climent
Luis María Lasúrtegui

Sailing
Alejandro Abascal
Marina Alabau
Santiago Amat
Sandra Azón
José Luis Ballester
Jordi Calafat
José Doreste
Luis Doreste
Fernando Echavarri
Támara Echegoyen
Xabier Fernández
Antonio Gorostegui
Patricia Guerra
Fernando Leon
Domingo Manrique
Iker Martínez
Pedro Millet
Roberto Molina
Miguel Noguer
Antón Paz Blanco
Ángela Pumariega
Kiko Sánchez
Sofía Toro
Rafael Trujillo
José van der Ploeg
Begoña Vía-Dufresne
Natalia Vía Dufresne
Theresa Zabell

Snowboarding
Queralt Castellet
Lucas Eguibar
Regino Hernández

Shooting
Jorge Guardiola
Ángel Léon
María Quintanal

Swimming
Mireia Belmonte
Sergio López Miró
David López-Zubero
Martin López-Zubero
Nina Zhivanevskaya

Synchronized swimming
Clara Basiana
Alba María Cabello
Ona Carbonell
Margalida Crespí
Andrea Fuentes
Thaïs Henríquez
Paula Klamburg
Gemma Mengual
Irene Montrucchio
Laia Pons

Table tennis
Galia Dvorak
Carlos Machado
Sara Ramírez
Shen Yanfei
He Zhi Wen

Taekwondo
Gabriel Esparza
Nicolás García
Joel González
Brigitte Yagüe

Tennis
Jordi Arrese
Sergi Bruguera
Sergio Casal
Àlex Corretja
Albert Costa
Juan Carlos Ferrero
Andrés Gimeno
Conchita Martínez
Anabel Medina Garrigues
Carlos Moyá
Garbiñe Muguruza
Rafael Nadal
Manuel Orantes
Virginia Ruano Pascual
Arantxa Sánchez Vicario
Emilio Sánchez
Manuel Santana

Triathlon
Virginia Berasategui
Francisco Javier Gómez Noya
Eneko Llanos
Mario Mola
Iván Raña

Volleyball
Enrique de la Fuente
Guillermo Falasca
Miguel Ángel Falasca
José Luis Moltó
Rafael Pascual
Ibán Pérez
Manuel Sevillano

Water polo

Male players
Josep Maria Abarca
Ángel Andreo
Daniel Ballart
Manuel Estiarte
Pedro Francisco García
Salvador Gómez
Marco Antonio González
Rubén Michavila
Iván Moro
Miguel Ángel Oca
Jorge Payá
Sergi Pedrerol
Josep Picó
Jesús Rollán
Ricardo Sánchez
Carles Sans
Jordi Sans
Manuel Silvestre

Female players
Marta Bach
Andrea Blas
Ana Copado
Anni Espar
Laura Ester
Maica García Godoy
Laura López
Ona Meseguer
Lorena Miranda
Matilde Ortiz
Jennifer Pareja
Pilar Peña Carrasco
Roser Tarragó

Weightlifting
Lydia Valentín

Wrestling
Maider Unda

See also
Spain at the Olympics
Sport in Spain

Spain